Demaria is a surname. Notable people with the surname include:

Attilio Demaría, (1909–1990), Italian Argentine footballer
Chris Demaria (born  1980), American baseball player
David DeMaría (born 1976), Spanish singer and songwriter
Félix Demaría (born 1912), Argentine professional footballer
Fernando Demaría (born 1928), Argentine poet, philosopher and classical scholar
Michael DeMaria (born 1962) American psychologist, author, and musician
Peter DeMaria (born 1960), American architect
Tatiana DeMaria (born ?), British songwriter, singer, multi-instrumentalist, record producer, and entrepreneur
Vincenzo DeMaria (born 1954), Italian-Canadian businessman and alleged mobster 
Yves Demaria (born 1972), French former professional motocross racer

See also  
 Demaria (disambiguation)
 De Maria